Britton Douglas Colquitt (born March 20, 1985) is an American football punter who is a free agent. He was originally signed by the Denver Broncos as an undrafted free agent in December 2009. He played college football at Tennessee.

Britton is the son of former NFL punter Craig Colquitt, younger brother of Cleveland Browns punter Dustin Colquitt, and nephew of former NFL punter Jimmy Colquitt.

Early years
Colquitt played football, basketball and soccer at Bearden High School in Knoxville, Tennessee.

College career
Colquitt played college football for the Tennessee Volunteers at the University of Tennessee, where he majored in political science. 
During the 2005, 2006, and 2007 seasons, he was the Volunteers first team punter. He earned consensus first-team All-SEC honors in 2006 and second-team All-SEC honors in 2007.

While at the University of Tennessee, Colquitt had a well-publicized saga with alcohol problems.  He was first suspended from the University of Tennessee football team in March 2004 after three alcohol-related arrests, despite having only arrived on campus in 2003.  In his junior season, he was suspended for the first five games of the season and had his scholarship stripped after being arrested on charges of DUI and leaving the scene of an accident.

Professional career

Miami Dolphins
Colquitt was signed to the practice squad of the Miami Dolphins on December 22, 2009.

Denver Broncos (second stint)
Colquitt was signed to the Denver Broncos' active roster from the Miami Dolphins' practice squad on December 30, 2009.

On September 12, 2010, in the season opener against the Jacksonville Jaguars, Colquitt made his NFL debut and had four punts for 172 net yards (43.00 average).

In the 2011 season, Colquitt accumulated 4,783 yards, enough for fifth all time for single-season punting yards.

On April 23, 2013, Colquitt signed his restricted free agent tender. On August 11, 2013, he signed a three-year extension worth $11.6 million on top of his one-year tender. The Broncos reached Super Bowl XLVIII, which they lost to the Seattle Seahawks by a score of 43–8. In the loss, he had two punts for 60 net yards.

Colquitt agreed to a $1.4 million pay cut on August 3, 2015.

On February 7, 2016, Colquitt was part of the Broncos team that won Super Bowl 50. In the game, the Broncos defeated the Carolina Panthers by a score of 24–10, giving Colquitt his first Super Bowl victory.

On August 30, 2016, Colquitt was released by the Broncos due to not accepting a pay cut.

's NFL off-season, Colquitt held at least 11 Broncos franchise records, including:
 Punts: playoffs (48), playoff season (23 in 2015), playoff game (9 on 2016-01-24 NWE)
 Punt Yards: season (4,783 in 2011), playoffs (2,104), playoff season (1,072 in 2015), playoff game (423 on 2016-01-24 NWE)
 Yards / Punt: career (45.17), season (47.36 in 2011), game (55.83 on 2011-09-18 CIN), playoff season (48.8 in 2012)

Cleveland Browns
On September 3, 2016, Colquitt signed a one-year deal with the Cleveland Browns worth $1.7 million.

On February 28, 2017, Colquitt signed a four-year contract extension with the Browns.

On August 31, 2019, Colquitt was released by the Browns.

Minnesota Vikings
On September 1, 2019, Colquitt was signed by the Minnesota Vikings.

On March 19, 2020, Colquitt signed a three-year, $9 million contract extension with the Vikings.

On September 1, 2021, Colquitt was released by the Vikings after the team signed Jordan Berry.

NFL career statistics

Regular season

Personal life
Several of Colquitt's family members have punted in the NFL. His father, Craig, won two Super Bowl rings playing for the Pittsburgh Steelers. His older brother, Dustin, spent 15 seasons as the punter for the Kansas City Chiefs and won a Super Bowl ring after the Chiefs victory in Super Bowl LIV. His uncle Jimmy punted at Tennessee. Jimmy played in the NFL with the Seattle Seahawks in 1985.

References

External links
Tennessee Volunteers bio
Denver Broncos bio

1985 births
Living people
Players of American football from Knoxville, Tennessee
American football punters
Tennessee Volunteers football players
Minnesota Vikings players
Denver Broncos players
Miami Dolphins players
Cleveland Browns players
Colquitt family